Robert F. Kennedy Human Rights (formerly the Robert F. Kennedy Center for Justice and Human Rights, or RFK Center) is an American 501(c)(3) nonprofit human rights advocacy organization. It was named after United States Senator Robert F. Kennedy in 1968, a few months after his assassination. The organization of leading attorneys, advocates, entrepreneurs and writers is dedicated to a more just and peaceful world, working alongside local activists to ensure lasting positive change in governments and corporations. It also promotes human rights advocacy through its RFK Human Rights Award, and supports investigative journalists and authors through the RFK Book and Journalism Awards. It is based in New York and Washington, D.C.

History
The Robert F. Kennedy Memorial was originally established as a non-profit organization in Washington, D.C., in October, 1968. The Kennedy family and friends looked to memorialize Robert Kennedy's public service following his assassination on June 5, 1968, in Los Angeles, California. Fred Dutton, a long-time friend and Kennedy ally, was named executive director, and Peter B. Edelman, a member of Kennedy's senatorial staff, became associate director. The chairman of the executive committee was former U.S. Secretary of Defense Robert S. McNamara.

The Memorial was announced during a press conference at Hickory Hill in McLean, Virginia, on Tuesday, October 29, 1968. Kennedy's brother Ted led the press conference, stating that the organization would be a "living memorial" that would work in areas of poverty, crime, and education in America. He went on to say the Memorial would be "an action-oriented program that we think will carry on his concerns, his actions, his efforts to work on so many of the problems in this country that have no solutions". He was joined at the press conference by his sisters, Patricia Kennedy Lawford and Jean Kennedy Smith, as well as dozens of Kennedy family friends and aides.

Kennedy's widow Ethel Kennedy did not attend the press conference, but was nearby, in a second-floor bedroom of Hickory Hill on doctor's orders, awaiting the birth of her eleventh child. She issued a statement saying it was the hope of her husband's family and friends that the Robert F. Kennedy Memorial would carry forward the ideals he worked for during his lifetime: "He wanted to encourage the young people and to help the disadvantaged and discriminated against both here and abroad, and he wanted to promote peace in the world. These will be the goals of the memorial."

The memorial and other projects started in Kennedy's memory were later collectively renamed Robert F. Kennedy Human Rights.

Awards

Human Rights Award 

The Robert F. Kennedy Human Rights Award was created by Kathleen Kennedy Townsend in 1984 to honor individuals around the world who show courage and have made a significant contribution to human rights in their country.

In addition to receiving a financial award, laureates work with the organization on human rights-related projects. Since 1984, awards have been given to 43 individuals and organizations from 25 different countries. The 2009 award was presented by President Barack Obama. In 2009, the RFK Human Rights began a partnership with the California International Law Center (CILC) at the University of California, Davis School of Law focusing on the crisis in Darfur.

Laureates

Book Award 
The Robert F. Kennedy Book Award was founded in 1980, with the proceeds from Arthur Schlesinger, Jr.'s biography, Robert Kennedy and His Times. Each year, the organization presents an award to the book which "most faithfully and forcefully reflects Robert Kennedy's purposes – his concern for the poor and the powerless, his struggle for honest and even-handed justice, his conviction that a decent society must assure all young people a fair chance, and his faith that a free democracy can act to remedy disparities of power and opportunity."

Winners
 2022 - The Sum of Us: What Racism Costs Everyone and How We Can Prosper Together by Heather McGhee and America on Fire: The Untold History of Police Violence and Black Rebellion Since the 1960s by Elizabeth Hinton
 2021 – Unworthy Republic:The Dispossession of Native Americans and the Road to Indian Territory by Claudio Saunt
 2020 – Dying of Whiteness: How the Politics of Racial Resentment Is Killing America's Heartland by Jonathan Metzl
 2019 – American Prison: A Reporter's Undercover Journey into the Business of Punishment by Shane Bauer
 2018 – Not a Crime to Be Poor: The Criminalization of Poverty in America by Peter Edelman / The Blood of Emmett Till by Timothy Tyson
 2017 – Evicted: Poverty and Profit in the American City by Matthew Desmond
 2016 – Once in a Great City: A Detroit Story by David Maraniss
 2015 – The Crusades of Cesar Chavez by Miriam Pawel
 2014 – The Great Dissent by Thomas Healy and special recognition to March: Book One by John Lewis, Andrew Aydin, and Nate Powell
 2013 – The Price of Inequality by Joseph Stiglitz
 2012 – The Justice Cascade by Kathryn Sikkink
 2011 – The Big Short by Michael Lewis
 2010 – Ordinary Injustice by Amy Bach
 2009 – The Dark Side by Jane Mayer
 2008 – Going Down Jericho Road by Michael Honey
 2007 – The Great Deluge by Douglas Brinkley
 2006 – Mirror to America by John Hope Franklin
 2005 – Perilous Times by Jeffrey Stone and We Are All the Same by Jim Wooten
 2004 – Ultimate Punishment by Scott Turow
 2003 – At the Hands of Persons Unknown by Philip Dray and A Problem from Hell by Samantha Power
 2002 – American Patriots by Gail Buckley
 2001 – Without Sanctuary by James Allen and Blood of the Liberals by George Packer
 2000 – Mandela: The Authorised Biography by Anthony Sampson and No Shame in My Game by Katherine Newman
 1999 – Walking with the Wind by John Lewis and Michael D'Orso
 1998 – Race, Crime and the Law by Randall Kennedy and The Soldiers' Tale by Samuel Hynes
 1997 – Worse Than Slavery by David M. Oshinsky
 1996 – Circumstantial Evidence: Death, Life, and Justice in a Southern Town by Pete Earley and The Politics of Rage: George Wallace, the Origins of the New Conservatism, and the Transformation of American Politics by Dan T. Carter
 1995 – Speak Now Against the Day by John Egerton
 1994 – Taming the Storm: The Life and Times of Judge Frank M. Johnson, Jr., and the South's Fight Over Civil Rights by Jack Bass and special recognition to Herbert Block for Herblock: A Cartoonist's Life 1993 – Earth in the Balance: Ecology and the Human Spirit by Vice President Al Gore
 1992 – Praying for Sheetrock by Melissa Fay Greene
 1991 – The Long Haul by Myles Horton and Herbert and Judith Kohl and The Burning Season: The Murder of Chico Mendes and the Fight for the Amazon Rain Forest by Andrew Revkin
 1990 – Among Schoolchildren by Tracy Kidder and Big Sugar by Alec Wilkinson
 1989 – A Bright Shining Lie by Neil Sheehan and Rachel and Her Children by Jonathan Kozol
 1988 – Beloved by Toni Morrison and Song in a Weary Throat by Pauli Murray
 1987 – Bearing the Cross: Martin Luther King, Jr., and the Southern Christian Leadership Conference, by David J. Garrow
 1986 – Common Ground: A Turbulent Decade in the Lives of Three American Families by J. Anthony Lukas and Reaping the Whirlwind: The Civil Rights Movement in Tuskegee by Robert Norrell
 1984 – Children of War by Roger Rosenblatt
 1983 – Let the Trumpet Sound: The Life of Martin Luther King, Jr. by Stephen B. Oates
 1982 – The Child Savers by Peter S. Prescott
 1981 – Civilities and Civil Rights: Greensboro, North Carolina, and the Black Struggle for Freedom'' by William Chafe

Journalism Award

The Robert F. Kennedy Journalism Award was established in 1968 by a group of reporters covering Kennedy's presidential campaign and "honors those who report on issues that reflect Kennedy's concerns including human rights, social justice and the power of individual action in the United States and around the world." Entries include insights into the causes, conditions and remedies of injustice and critical analysis of relevant public policies, programs, attitudes and private endeavors.

Led by a committee of six independent journalists, the Awards are judged by more than fifty journalists each year. Previous winners include World News anchor Diane Sawyer.

See also
List of human rights organisations

References

External links
 

Robert F. Kennedy
Foundations based in the United States
Human rights organizations based in the United States
Organizations established in 1968